Island View Beach is located on the traditional territory of the Tsawout First Nation, on the Eastern Cordova shore of the Saanich Peninsula, near Victoria, British Columbia, Canada.
  
Much of the southern part of the foreshore make up the public Island View Beach Regional Park. The Tsawout First Nation has a reservation fronting much of the northern end of the beach. The Tsawout have been living and gathering seafood from the ocean and well as gathering local medicinal plants, as part of the culture for thousands of years.  The first known European visitors were James Douglas and first mate Scott M. Jenkin in the latter half of the 18th century. Located southwest of James Island, to locals it is known as the "Beach of Destiny". Located at Homathko and Puckle Road, public parking. There is a public campground (part of the regional park) which is open for the summer season from the Victoria Day long weekend in May to the Labour Day long weekend in September.

Visitors should be aware there is off leash dog restrictions from June 1 to September 15. Dogs should be kept on leash in beach and picnic areas and are not allowed to stay overnight. Island View Beach Regional Park ("I-View") is a BC Regional Park, therefore facilities are located for those who are in need of garbage cans and or washrooms. Island View Beach has  a damaged boat launch for access to Haro Strait and the Cordova Channel.

The Island View Beach terrain consists of beach, dune, and marshland, that supports a wide range of local wild animal and plant species. Due to human activity over the last century this ecological area has placed local wild animal and plant species to possible risk, and endangerment.

Possible species at risk have been identified as:
Contorted Pod Evening Primrose,
Sand Verbena moth,
Common Night Hawk,
Bank Swallow,
Barn Swallow,
Marbled Murrelet,
Olive-sided Flycatcher,
Peregrine Falcon,
Horned Grebe,
Great Blue Heron,
Short-eared Owl,
Long-billed Curlew,
Western Grebe,
Ancient Murrelet,
Band-tailed Pigeon,
Georgia Basin Bog Spider,
Common Murre,
Brandt's Cormorant,
Brant,
Cackling Goose,
Long-tailed Duck,
California Gull,
Surf Scoter,
Red-necked Phalarope,
Purple Martin,
Yellow Sand-verbena,
Beach Bindweed,
American Glehnia,
Fleshy Jaumea,
Black Knotweed,
Double-crested Cormorant,
Snowy Owl,
Caspian Tern

References

External links
 Island View Park
 Saanichton  Campground - Island View Beach RV/Tent Camp
 BC Parks - Island View Beach Regional Park, Vancouver Island

Beaches of British Columbia
Saanich Peninsula
Parks in British Columbia